Ulsyn Khevleliin Gazar ("National Publishing House") is a prominent Mongolian publishing house.

Selected publications
Undaassan Burkhad (The Gods are Thirsty) (1969) by Anatole France
 Naran Togoruu (1972) by Sengiin Erdene.
 Gazar Tenger (1977) by Dorjiin Garmaa
 Igoriin Khoroony Tuuj (1985) by Tsendiin Damdinsüren
 Chuluutai Gazar: Nairuulluud (1986) by Bat-Ochiryn Tömörtogoo
 Olon ulsyn monopoli ba khöröngötnii ediin zasgiin setgelgee (1987) by Vadim Borisovich Buglai
Goviin Ikh Darkhan Gazar (1990) by Ochiryn Namnandorj

References

Book publishing companies of Mongolia